Ram air refers to the principle of using the airflow created by a moving object to increase ambient pressure, known as ram pressure.  Often, the purpose of a ram air system is to increase an engine's power.

The term "ram air" may also refer to:
Parafoils, also called ram air parachutes, non-rigid airfoils inflated by wind
Ram-air intake – an air intake system that aids in engine performance and cooling, commonly used on aircraft and other high-performance vehicles
Pontiac "Ram Air" Engines -- a line of performance oriented engines developed in the 1960s and 1970s by General Motors' Pontiac Motor Division
Short ram air intake – a smaller, aftermarket version of ram-air intakes, commonly used on automobiles
Ram air turbine – a propeller used by aircraft to generate power

See also
 Air ram
 RamAir, a student radio station at the University of Bradford